Take-Off is a 1979 Soviet biopic about the Russian rocket scientist Konstantin Tsiolkovsky, directed by Savva Kulish and based on a screenplay by Oleg Osetinsky.

Savva Kulish was nominated for this film at the 11th Moscow International Film Festival, winning the Silver Prize.

Cast
 Yevgeni Yevtushenko as Konstantin Tsiolkovsky
 Larisa Kadochnikova as Varvara Yevgrafovna
 Albert Filozov as Panin
 Yelena Finogeyeva as Lyuba
 Kirill Arbuzov as Ignati
 V. Aleksandrov as Tailor
 Georgi Burkov as Rokotov
 Ion Ungureanu as Priest
 Vladimir Sedov as Yevgraf Nikolayevich
 Vladimir Erenberg as Trustee
 Olga Barnet as Trustee's wife
 Sergei Nasibov as Dmitri
 Anna Chizhikova as Masha, Tsiolkovsky's daughter
 Alla Chizhikova as Anya, Tsiolkovsky's daughter
 Anton Glotov as Irnatik, Tsiolkovsky's son
 Svetlana Reymouk as Lyuba
 Olegar Fedoro as Gendarme officer
 Amayak Akopyan
 Lidiya Dranovskaya
 Konstantin Zabelin
 S. Vologdin
 A. Golitsyn

Stunt departament: Aleksandr Inshakov, Tadeush Kasyanov, Andrei Nikolayev, K. Feklin, S. Kharmandzhayev, A. Massarsky, V. Nikitin, A. Yanovsky

References

External links

1979 films
1970s biographical drama films
Soviet biographical drama films
Russian biographical drama films
Mosfilm films
1970s Russian-language films
1979 drama films